Lucius Mindius is an unattested Roman Aristocrat who lived in the Roman Empire in the second half of the 1st century. Mindius was a Roman Senator of Consular rank. Little is known on his origins. In 84, Mindius married Salonia Matidia, the niece of future Roman Emperor Trajan, becoming her second husband. Matidia was previously widowed from her first marriage to suffect consul Lucius Vibius Sabinus, who left Matidia a daughter Vibia Sabina.

In 85, Matidia bore Mindius a daughter called Mindia Matidia, commonly known as Matidia Minor or Matidia the Younger. Like Matidia's first marriage, Matidia's marriage to Lucius Mindius was short-lived. Shortly after the birth of Mindia Matidia, Lucius Mindius had died. In 86 Matidia married the consul Lucius Scribonius Libo Rupilius Frugi Bonus.

Sources
 http://www.roman-emperors.org/goodemp2.htm
 Julian Bennett, Trajan: Optimus Princeps, a Life and Times, Illustrated edition (Routledge, 1997) , 

85 deaths
1st-century Romans
Nerva–Antonine dynasty
Senators of the Roman Empire
Romans from unknown gentes
1st-century births
Year of birth unknown